The Ware Steam Wagon was the first self-propelled American vehicle to be manufactured for export. Elijah Ware, of Bayonne, New Jersey, manufactured the Wagon between 1861 and 1867. In 1866 one of his vehicles was shipped to Rustico, Prince Edward Island, where it had been ordered by Catholic priest Georges-Antoine Belcourt. Unlike other steam powered contraptions of the time, this did not run on a rail system.

1861 introductions
Steam road vehicles
Defunct motor vehicle manufacturers of the United States
1860s cars